Austin Krajicek and Jeevan Nedunchezhiyan were the defending champions but only Nedunchezhiyan chose to defend his title, partnering Purav Raja. Nedunchezhiyan lost in the first round to Jason Jung and Evan King.

JC Aragone and Bradley Klahn won the title after defeating Christopher Eubanks and Thai-Son Kwiatkowski 7–5, 6–4 in the final.

Seeds

Draw

References

External links
 Main draw

Nielsen Pro Tennis Championship - Doubles
2019 Doubles